Igor Olegovich Kireyev (born 17 February 1992) is a Russian professional football player who plays as a right back or right midfielder.

Club career
Kireyev made his Russian Premier League debut on 14 March 2010 for Spartak Moscow in a game against Dynamo Moscow.
On 17 February 2014, Rostov announced loaning Kireyev out to Spartak Nalchik for the remaining part of 2013–14 season.

He scored for FC Avangard Kursk but in vain as FC Tosno won the 2017–18 Russian Cup final against FC Avangard Kursk 2–1 on the 9 May 2018 in the Volgograd Arena. Before that, he scored the winning goal in the semi-final that allowed Avangard to advance to the final.

Career statistics

Club

References

External links
 
 
 

1992 births
People from Zheleznogorsk, Kursk Oblast
Living people
Russian footballers
Russia youth international footballers
Russia under-21 international footballers
Association football defenders
Association football midfielders
Russian Premier League players
FC Spartak Moscow players
FC Rostov players
PFC Spartak Nalchik players
FC Amkar Perm players
FC Mordovia Saransk players
FC Avangard Kursk players
FC Yenisey Krasnoyarsk players
FC Irtysh Omsk players
Sportspeople from Kursk Oblast